For the defunct provincial electoral district, see Essex South (provincial electoral district).

Essex South was a federal and provincial electoral district represented in the House of Commons of Canada from 1882 to 1968. It was located in the province of Ontario. This riding was created in 1882 from parts of Essex riding.

It was created when the County of Essex was divided into two ridings: Essex North and Essex South. It initially consisted of the townships of Anderdon, Malden, North Colchester, South Colchester, Gosfield, Mersea, the town of Amherstburg, the villages of Leamington and Kingsville, and Pelée Island in the county of Essex.

In 1903, it was expanded to include the townships of Malden, Tilbury North, Tilbury West, Essex, and the portion of the village of Tilbury lying in the county of Essex. In 1914, it was expanded to include the village of Wheatley lying in the county of Essex.

In 1924, it was redefined to consist of the townships of Anderdon, Malden, Sandwich South, Colchester (North and South), Gosfield (North and South), Mersea and Pelee Island in the county of Essex, and the part of the village of Wheatley lying in the county of Kent. In 1933, it was expanded to exclude the township of Sandwich South, and the village of Wheatley. In 1947, it was redefined to include Pelee Island, Sandwich South, Tilbury West and the town of Essex, and exclude the village of Wheatley and the town of Tilbury.

In 1952, it was redefined to consist of the townships of Anderdon, Malden, Colchester (North and South), Gosfield (North and South), Mersea, Pelee Island, Sandwich South, Tilbury West and the town of Essex but excluding the village of Wheatley.

The electoral district was abolished in 1966 when it was redistributed between Essex and Essex—Kent ridings.

Members of Parliament

This riding elected the following members of the House of Commons of Canada:

Election results

Federal

|}

|}

|}

|}

|}

|}

|}

|}

|}

|}

On Mr. Graham's being named Minister of Militia and Defence, 29 December 1921, and Minister of Naval Service, 29 December 1921:

|}

|}

|}

|}

|}

|}

|}

|}

|}

|}

|}

|}

|}

|}

Provincial (partial)

See also 

 List of Canadian federal electoral districts
 Past Canadian electoral districts

External links 
Riding history from the Library of Parliament

Former federal electoral districts of Ontario
Former provincial electoral districts of Ontario